Astragalus aquilonius, the Lemhi milkvetch, is a species of milkvetch in the family Fabaceae. It is native to Idaho.

References

aquilonius
Flora of Idaho
Flora without expected TNC conservation status